Leonard Joseph Zengel, Sr. (15 March 1887 – 24 September 1963) was an American racecar driver.

Biography
He was born on 15 March 1887 in Dayton, Ohio to Leonard A. Zengel (1857-1930). His siblings were, George H. Zengel (May 2, 1880-April 1957), Sophia Zengel (August 1882-?), Jennie L. Zengel (December 1884-?), Michael E. Zengel Sr. (July 1889-?), Charlie Zengel (March 14, 1893 – June 27, 1962), Dorothy A. Zengel (January 1899-?), and Murray A. Zengel (July 16, 1895-April 1968).

On October 8, 1910 he won the annual Fairmount Park road race in Philadelphia driving a Chadwick Engineering Works auto.

In 1911 he won the Elgin Trophy.

He participated in the 1912 Indianapolis 500.

He married Mary L. Howell and had a son, Leonard Joseph Zengel, Jr. (1915-1944) who died in a car accident when he fell asleep at the wheel in Pittsburgh, Pennsylvania. He had a daughter, Betty Jean Zengel.

He operated a Chrysler and Plymouth dealership.

He died on 24 September 1963 in Bryn Mawr, Pennsylvania at age 76.

Indy 500 results

References

Indianapolis 500 drivers
1887 births
1963 deaths
Racing drivers from Dayton, Ohio